Qatar is a nation situated eastwards of the Arabian peninsula of which it is considered a part of. Upwards of 30 reptile species
 have been recorded as living in the country. Most of the country is arid, with a presence of dunes in the far south, close to neighbouring Saudi Arabia.

Qatar possesses three forms of environment in which reptiles can be observed - Arid, urban, and marine. The country is relatively even in height and low, as its highest natural point is only 103 metres above sea level.

 
There are several species that are considered dangerous, thus an exclamation mark (!) will be used to highlight a species that may cause harm to humans, and a skull if the animal is responsible for at least one human fatality

Sea turtles

Order: TestudinesFamily: Cheloniidae

Cheloniidae is a family of sea turtles with cosmopolitan distribution. The family contains seven species in five genera. Two of these species have been recorded in Qatar.

Leatherback turtle

Order: TestudinesFamily: Dermochelyidae

Dermochelyidae is a family of turtles which historically had 7 species. Currently, only one species still exists - the leatherback turtle. It is the largest member of its order, and the third-largest reptile in terms of average mass.
. Though uncommon, it has been reported in the country.

Geckos

Order: SquamataFamily: Gekkonidae

Gekkonidae is a large family of cosmopolitan lizards. It is a remarkably diverse family with upwards of a thousand species. Bearing specially-designed pads on their toes, geckos are granted effective adhesion to several surfaces. Vernacularly known as “بريعصي ", there are at least 10 species in Qatar.

Agamids

Order: SquamataFamily: Agamidae

Agamidae is a large family of Old World lizards distributed across a multitude of habitats. Globally, the family contains approximately 350 species

Skinks

Order: SquamataFamily: Scincidae

Scincidae is a family of lizards, commonly known as skinks. It is one of the biggest families in the entire order, bearing well over 1,500 species
. They are primarily terrestrial and insectivorous

Monitors

Order: SquamataFamily: Varanidae

Varanidae is a family of highly predatory and venomous lizards in the old world. There are about 45 species, one of which is found in Qatar.

True Lizards

Order: SquamataFamily: Lacertidae

Lacertidae is a family diverse family of lizards, of which the entire suborder derived its name

Palaearctic worm-lizard

Order: SquamataFamily: Trogonophidae

Trogonophidae is a family of amphisbaenians. They do not possess any limbs and engage in a primarily underground lifestyle.

Colubrids

Order: SquamataFamily: Colubridae

Colubridae is the largest family of snakes, with over 230 species. They are primarily constrictors, however there are some species that possess venom.

Sea snakes

Order: SquamataFamily: Hydrophiinae

Hydrophiinae is a family of snakes, most of which are highly venomous. They inhabit coastal environments and are specially adapted for an aquatic lifestyle

Vipers

Order: SquamataFamily: Viperidae

Viperidae is a family of highly venomous snakes found throughout the majority of the mainland continents. It is a relatively diverse family with more than 200 species.

Boas

Order: SquamataFamily: Boidae

Boidae is a family of nonvenomous constricting snakes that inhabit tropical and semi-tropical regions. There are over 40  species in the family

Elapids

Order: SquamataFamily: Elapidae

Elapidae is a family of highly venomous snakes with non-retractable fangs. It includes the well-known cobras. There are over 300  species in the family

References

Qatar
Qatar
Reptiles